Genghis Khan, original full title , is a 1987 turn-based strategy game developed by Koei, originally released for the NEC PC-9801, MSX and Sharp X68000 in 1988, the DOS and NES in 1990, and the Amiga in 1990. It is actually the second game in the series, after a 1985 Aoki Ōkami to Shiroki Mejika, also for PC-88, PC-98, and MSX.

Plot
The game takes the player inside the virtual life of either Genghis Khan or one of his archrivals. The player must arrange marriages, father children, appoint family members to governmental positions, and fight in order to conquer the Old World. Armies must be drafted and soldiers must be trained if the player is to rule the lands from England to Japan.

Gameplay
The game has two different ways to play. The first is Mongol Conquest, which begins in the year 1175 A.D, which is a one player mode. Players assume control of Lord Temujin and they must conquer the land by keeping their economy stable, having their army ready to fight, and by attacking other lands. The second is World Conquest, where the goal is to conquer every opposing country.

World Conquest, which begins in the year 1206 A.D, is started by choosing the number of players and difficulty. It supports 1-4 players. Players must choose who they want to be; Genghis Khan (Mongols), Alexios I (Byzantine), Richard (England), or Yoritomo (Japan). Then each player must randomly select the stats of their leader and successors. The player must stop a random number to choose the certain stat. This is done until all stats are chosen for the certain character, but they can be redone. After everyone is ready to go, the game begins. The countries of Eurasia cycle through; when it goes through a country, it means they have used their turn. When it comes to a player's country, they get to make three choices. These choices include training the troops, buying a certain product/quantity from a merchant, drafting soldiers, sending a treaty, or going to war. Each act takes one choice away until the three choices are used; then the cycle continues. Once every country has used their turns, the season changes and the cycle goes through again, but in a different order. Seasons determine when you must pay your troops, when the farmers harvest the crop, when food must be distributed, etc.

Reception
In 1989, Computer Gaming World called Genghis Khan "the toughest, most satisfying, and richest historical simulation, yet!". In a 1990 survey of pre-20th century wargames the magazine gave it four out of five stars, and in 1993 three stars. Orson Scott Card viewed it unfavorably, writing in Compute! that compared to Romance "the tedium is back" regarding gameplay, but another reviewer for the magazine stated that "Genghis Khan is an excellent prerequisite to a real leadership experience because it forces you to gauge your resources before making decisions". In 2008, Armağan Yavuz, the co-founder of Turkish developer TaleWorlds cited Koei's Genghis Khan as an influence on their Mount & Blade series.

See also

List of Famicom Games

References

External links

Genghis Khan at GameFAQs

1987 video games
Amiga games
Video games set in the Mongol Empire
DOS games
Genghis Khan video games
FM-7 games
Koei games
MSX games
MSX2 games
NEC PC-8801 games
NEC PC-9801 games
Nintendo Entertainment System games
Sharp MZ games
Sharp X1 games
X68000 games
Turn-based strategy video games
Video games scored by Yoko Kanno
Video games set in feudal Japan
War video games set in Asia
War video games set in Europe
Windows games
Video games developed in Japan
Video games set in the Byzantine Empire
Video games set in medieval England
Multiplayer and single-player video games